Curti is a census town in North Goa district in Goa, India.

Geography
It has an average elevation of 30 metres (98 feet).

Demographics
 India census, Curti had a population of 13,070. Males constitute 53% of the population and females 47%. Curti has an average literacy rate of 71%, higher than the national average of 59.5%: male literacy is 75% and, female literacy is 67%. In Curti, 13% of the population is under 6 years of age.

References

Cities and towns in North Goa district